Monsters in Love is the fifth studio album by the French rock band Dionysos, released 29 August 2005 and produced by John Parish. The album features songs in both English and French.

Background
This album was written by the band's lead singer after the death of his mother. A lot of the songs and characters began as short stories which he was writing to help deal with his bereavement. A book by the lead singer also accompanies the album: Maintenant qu'il fait tout le temps nuit sur toi.

There has also been a live album and DVD released (Monsters in Live) featuring many of the songs that appear on this album.

Track listing
All songs: music and lyrics by Dionysos, except where stated
 "Giant Jack's theme"
 "Giant Jack"
 "La métamorphose de Mister Chat"
 "L'homme qui pondait des œufs"
 "Broken bird"
 "Miss Acacia"
 "Le retour de Bloody Betty"
 "Mon ombre est personne"
 "I love Liou"
 "Lips story in a chocolate river"
 "Giant John et le sanglophone" 
 "Tes lacets sont des fées"
 "Old child"
 "Monsters in love"
 "Midnight letter"
 "Neige" + hidden track "I did acid with Caroline"

Personnel

The band
Mathias Malzieu – vocals, acoustic guitar
Mike Ponton – guitar
Eric Serra-Tosio – drums, percussion
Élisabeth Maistre  – violin, vocals
Stéphan Bertholio – keys, musical saw, melodica, glockenspiel, banjo

Guests
The Kills – vocals on "Old child"

Additional musicians
Sophie Whitehead – 'claquettes' (on "Le retour de Bloody Betty")
Silke Volland –  violin and string arrangements
Tobias Unterberg –  cello
Yvonne Fechner –  violin (on "Broken bird", "Mon ombre est personne", "Monsters in love" and "I love Liou")
Bethany Porter –  cello (on "Giant John et le sanglophone")
John Parish – tambourine (on "La métamorphose de Mister Chat" and "Broken bird"), maracas (on "Le retour de Bloody Betty), glockenspiel (on "L'homme qui pondait de œufs" and "La métamorphose de Mister Chat"), spoken word (on "Giant John et le sanglophone")
David Vernon – brass arrangements
Mike Daden – trombone (on "Tes lacets sont des fées")
Dolan Jones – trumpet (on "Tes lacets sont des fées")
Dan Jones – tuba (on "Tes lacets sont des fées")

Production
Produced and mixed by John Parish
Sound engineer Paul Corkett
Assistant Nick Joplin
Mastered by John Dent at Loud Mastering

2005 albums
Dionysos (French band) albums
Albums produced by John Parish
French-language albums